We (stylized in all caps) is the fifth extended play by South Korean girl group EXID. It was released on May 15, 2019 by Banana Culture. The EP marked their last release as a group in South Korea prior to a three year hiatus as well as their final release under Banana Culture overall.

Background 
On May 3, 2019, Banana Culture announced that members Hani and Jeonghwa decided to not renew their contracts with the agency. Meanwhile, members LE, Solji, and Hyelin decided to renew their contracts with the agency, stating that the group will not disband.

On the same day, Banana Culture informed that the group will release their fifth mini-album on May 15 and after the release and promotions for this album, the group will take an indefinite hiatus. It was also noted that members Hani and Jeonghwa agreed to promote the album.

On May 6, a comeback time table was released stating that the album would be released on May 15 and a showcase would be held. The full track list was also revealed.

Commercial performance 
We debuted at number 8 on the US World Albums Chart for the week ending May 25, 2019. This is their fifth album to chart and their fourth top 10.

The EP was the 15th best-selling album in May 2019 with 24,423 physical copies sold.

Track listing

Charts

Release history

References 

2019 EPs
EXID albums